Aspen Healthcare is a private medical company, established in 1988, based in the City of London. It is not connected with Aspen Pharmacare, the South African pharmaceutical company.

It was a subsidiary of United Surgical Partners International.   

In early 2015, Welltower purchased all four of the company's London hospitals for £226 million. The hospitals were then leased back to Aspen which continues to operate them. The deal included Holly House Hospital, Highgate Private Hospital, Parkside Private Hospital and Cancer Centre London. They were leased back to Aspen for 25-year terms. 

Tenet Healthcare bought the company in 2015.   It sold the company to NMC Health in August 2018 for £10 million.

It runs Highgate Private Hospital, Parkside Private Hospital in Wimbledon, and Claremont Hospital in Sheffield.  

About half the company's income comes from orthopaedics and oncology. Less than 30% comes from the NHS.  

The company was acquired by NMC Health in August 2018.

References

Private providers of NHS services
Companies based in the City of London